Major facilitator superfamily domain containing 14B (MFSD14B, HIATL1) is an atypical solute carrier of MFS type. It locates to intracellular membranes.

HGNC:23376

TCDB: 2.A.1.2.30

MFSD14B cluster to AMTF1, together with MFSD9, MFSD10 and MFSD14A.

References 

Protein superfamilies
Solute carrier family
Transmembrane proteins
Transport proteins